Ralph David Abernathy III (March 19, 1959 – March 17, 2016) was an American politician and businessman.

Biography
Born in Montgomery, Alabama, Abernathy was the son of Ralph Abernathy and Juanita Abernathy, the civil rights activists. He was named "III" after his older brother, Ralph David Abernathy Jr., died in infancy. He received his bachelor's degree in English and Linguistics from Morehouse College in 1981. Abernathy owned Clean Air Industries in Atlanta, Georgia. Abernathy served in the Georgia House of Representatives, as a Democrat in 1988 and then in the Georgia State Senate in 1992. In 1997, Abernathy was indicted and convicted of smuggling marijuana into the United States from Jamaica, forgery, making a false statement, and witness tampering.

In 1999, he was convicted of defrauding the state of Georgia of thousands of dollars in expense money, numerous counts of theft, forgery and tampering with a witness. He was sentenced to four years in prison. Abernathy died of cancer in Atlanta, Georgia, on March 17, 2016, two days before his 57th birthday.

Notes

1959 births
2016 deaths
Politicians from Montgomery, Alabama
Politicians from Atlanta
Morehouse College alumni
African-American state legislators in Georgia (U.S. state)
Businesspeople from Georgia (U.S. state)
Democratic Party Georgia (U.S. state) state senators
Democratic Party members of the Georgia House of Representatives
Georgia (U.S. state) politicians convicted of crimes
Deaths from cancer in Georgia (U.S. state)
20th-century American businesspeople
Prisoners and detainees of Georgia (U.S. state)
21st-century American criminals
20th-century African-American people
21st-century African-American people
Abernathy family of Alabama